Love and the Devil is a 1929 American silent drama film directed by Alexander Korda and starring Milton Sills, María Corda and Ben Bard.

Production
It was the last time Korda worked with his wife María Corda who he had directed frequently over the previous decade but whose career went into sharp decline once sound films came in. Like Korda's previous film Night Watch the film had sound effects and music but no dialogue and was largely therefore a silent film. His next film The Squall would be his first "talkie", as the technology became rapidly established in the wake of The Jazz Singer.

Cast
 Milton Sills - Lord Dryan 
 María Corda - Giovanna 
 Ben Bard - Barotti

See also
List of early Warner Bros. sound and talking features

References

Bibliography
 Kulik, Karol. Alexander Korda: The Man Who Could Work Miracles. Virgin Books, 1990.

External links
 

1929 films
1929 drama films
American silent feature films
Silent American drama films
1920s English-language films
Films directed by Alexander Korda
First National Pictures films
American black-and-white films
1920s American films